Andrija Rajović (born 7 September 2001) is a Danish professional footballer of Montenegrin descent who plays as a midfielder for Serbian club FK Spartak Subotica.

References

External links
 

2001 births
Footballers from Copenhagen
Living people
Danish men's footballers
Montenegrin footballers
Association football midfielders
Hvidovre IF players
FK Zvijezda 09 players
FK Spartak Subotica players
FK Rudar Prijedor players
First League of the Republika Srpska players
Serbian SuperLiga players
Premier League of Bosnia and Herzegovina players
Montenegrin expatriate footballers
Expatriate footballers in Bosnia and Herzegovina
Montenegrin expatriate sportspeople in Bosnia and Herzegovina
Expatriate footballers in Serbia
Montenegrin expatriate sportspeople in Serbia